John Leslie Dowe is an Australian botanist who specialises in palms.

Published names (selected)
Archontophoenix maxima Dowe (1994) Austrobaileya 4(2): 235.
Balaka streptostachys D.Fuller & Dowe (1999) Palms 43(1): 10.
Livistona decora (W.Bull) Dowe (2004) Austrobaileya 6: 979.Calyptrocalyx hollrungii (Becc.) Dowe & M.D.Ferrero (2001) Blumea 46(2): 226.
(A complete list may be found at IPNI.)

 Publications (selected) 
Dowe, J.L. (2016) Charles Weldon (de Burgh) Birch (Count Zelling), an unassuming botanical and zoological collector in central and north-eastern Queensland. North Queensland Naturalist 46
Dowe, J.L. (2016) ODOARDO BECCARI AND ENRICO D’ALBERTIS IN AUSTRALIA AND NEW ZEALAND, 1878: BOTANICAL AND ZOOLOGICAL COLLECTIONS. Papers and Proceedings of the Royal Society of Tasmania 150, 27-41.
Dowe, J.L. (2017) Baron Ferdinand von Mueller, the "Princeps of Australian Botany", and a Historical Account of his Australasian Palms. Palms'' 61,

 See also: James Cook University: Research online - some publications of John L. Dowe

References

External links

20th-century Australian botanists
Year of birth missing (living people)
Living people
21st-century Australian botanists